The Schleswig-Holstein Cup (German: Schleswig-Holstein Pokal) is one of the 21 regional cup competitions of German football. It is a qualifying competition for the German Cup, with the winner of the competition being automatically qualified for the first round of the German Cup in the following season. For sponsorship reasons, the official name of the competition is SHFV-LOTTO-Pokal.

History
The competition was first held in 1953–54, with TSV Brunsbüttelkoog being the first winner. It has since been held annually, with Holstein Kiel (16 titles) and VfB Lübeck (16 titles) being most successful teams. The 2011 final was held on 3 June between those two sides, with Holstein winning the game 3–0.

Modus
All teams from Schleswig-Holstein playing in the 3. Liga and the Regionalliga Nord plus the eleven regional cup winners (Kreispokale) are qualified for the first round and the competition is played in single-game knock-out format.

Winners
The winners of the competition:

 ‡ Won by reserve team.

References

Sources
Deutschlands Fußball in Zahlen,  An annual publication with tables and results from the Bundesliga to Verbandsliga/Landesliga, publisher: DSFS

External links
 Schleswig-Holstein football association website 
 Official DFB results website 

Recurring sporting events established in 1953
1953 establishments in West Germany
Football cup competitions in Germany
Football competitions in Schleswig-Holstein